The flat pseudospectral method is part of the family of the Ross–Fahroo pseudospectral methods introduced by Ross and Fahroo.  The method combines the concept of differential flatness with pseudospectral optimal control  to generate outputs in the so-called flat space.

Concept
 

By differential flatness, there exists functions   and  such that the state and control variables can be written as,

 

The combination of these concepts generates the flat pseudospectral method; that is, x and u are written as,

Thus, an optimal control problem can be quickly and easily transformed to a problem with just the Y pseudospectral variable.

See also
Ross' π lemma
Ross–Fahroo lemma
Bellman pseudospectral method

References

Optimal control
Numerical analysis
Control theory